Just Between Us is the debut album by Gerald Albright, released on October 27, 1987, by Atlantic Records.

Critical reception

Andy Kellman of AllMusic wrote: "The sparkling 'So Amazing', featuring Albright in typically joyous form, was the major single—a number 12 hit on Billboard's Hot Black Singles chart. This established Albright's long-term presence at the fore of commercial jazz."

Charts

"So Amazing", a song written by Luther Vandross, peaked at No. 12 on January 29, 1988, on the Billboard Hot Black Singles chart. The album peaked at No. 181 for 5 weeks, beginning on March 11, 1988, on the Billboard 200 and was also listed at No. 32 on Billboard Top Black Albums chart for the week of December 26, 1987.

Track listing

Musicians 
 Gerald Albright – alto saxophone, tenor saxophone, bass guitar, backing vocals 
 Chuckii Booker – keyboards 
 Rodney Franklin – keyboards, drum programming  
 Bobby Lyle – keyboards 
 Patrice Rushen – keyboards 
 Greg Moore – guitars 
 Billy Griffin – bass guitar 
 Harvey Mason – drums, drum programming 
 Lloyd Michael Cook – drums 
 Craig Burbidge – drum programming
 David Stewart – drum programming
 Plato Brown – percussion 
 Terral Santiel – percussion 
 Arish Rountree – lead vocals (1)
 Bridgette Bryant – lead vocals (6), backing vocals 
 Billy Griffin – lead vocals (8), backing vocals 
 Maxi Anderson – backing vocals
 Fred White – backing vocals

Production 
 Producer – Gerald Albright
 Associate Producer – Rodney Franklin
 Executive Producers – Merlin Bobb and Sylvia Rhone
 Recorded and Mixed by Craig Burbidge
 Associate Engineers – Elizabeth Cluse, T. Sumiko Green, John Guggenheim, Fred Howard, David Konig, David Kopatz, Jane McCord and Ted Pattison.
 Mastered by Steve Hall at Future Disc (Hollywood, California).
 Production Administration – Serapis Productions
 Art Direction – Bob Defrin
 Type Design  – Jodi Rovin
 Wardrobe and Styling – Glynis Albright 
 Make-up – Labella
 Hair Stylist – Rudy Pounds
 Management – Raymond A. Shields II

Charts

Weekly charts

Year-end charts

References

External links
Gerald Albright Official Site
Atlantic Records Official Site

1987 debut albums
Atlantic Records albums